A respirator fit test checks whether a respirator properly fits the face of someone who wears it. The fitting characteristic of a respirator is the ability of the mask to separate a worker's respiratory system from ambient air.

This is achieved by tightly pressing the mask flush against the face (without gaps) to ensure an efficient seal on the mask perimeter. Because wearers cannot be protected if there are gaps, it is necessary to test the fit before entering into contaminated air. Multiple forms of the test exist.

Scientific studies have shown that if the mask size and shape is correctly fitted to the employees’ face, they will be better protected in hazardous workplaces. Facial hair such as a beard can interfere with proper fit.

History 
The effectiveness of various types of respirators was measured in laboratories and in the workplace. These measurements showed that in practice, the effectiveness of negative pressure tight fitting respiratory protective devices (RPD) depends on leakage between mask and face, rather than the filters/canisters. This decrease in efficiency due to leakage manifested on a large scale during World War I, when gas masks were used to protect against chemical weapons. Poor fit or poorly situated masks could be fatal. The Russian army began to use short-term exposure to chlorine at low concentrations to solve this problem in 1917. Such testing helped convince the soldiers that their gas masks were reliable - because respirators were a novelty. Later, industrial workers were trained in gas chambers in the USSR (in preparation for the Second World War), and late'. German firefighters used a similar test between the First and Second World Wars. Diluted chloropicrin was used to test industrial gas masks. The Soviet Army used chloropicrin in tents with a floor space of 16 square meters.

The US army provides military training using an irritating smoke.

Fit test methods 
Respirator selection and use are regulated by national legislation in many countries. These requirements include a test of negative pressure mask for each individual wearer.

Qualitative and quantitative fit test methods (QLFT & QNFT) exist. Detailed descriptions are given in the US standard, developed by Occupational Safety and Health Administration OSHA. This standard regulates respirator selection and organization (Appendix A describes fit testing). Compliance with this standard is mandatory for US employers.

Qualitative  
These methods use the reaction of workers to the taste or smell of a special material (if it leaks into mask) - gas, vapors or aerosols. Such reactions are subjective, making this test dependent on the subject reporting results honestly. A qualitative fit test starts with an unfiltered/non-respirator sampling of the substance of choice to verify that the subject can detect it accurately. Substances include:

 Isoamyl acetate—This substance has the smell of bananas. It is used only for fit testing of elastomeric masks.
 Saccharin—An aerosol of an aqueous solution of saccharin (Sodium saccharin) is used to test both an elastomeric and filtering respirator masks. Saccharin is perceived as sweet. The subject breathes through the mouth, slightly sticking out the tongue. The aerosol is created using a simple aerosol generator with rubber "pear", which is compressed manually.
 Denatonium—A substance with a bitter taste can be used to detect gaps. It is mixed with water and sprayed in the same manner as the above materials.

 Irritant smoke—An irritating smoke causes irritation of the mucous membranes—resulting in discomfort, coughing, sneezing, etc. NIOSH recommended discontinuing this method, because research showed that exposure may significantly exceed the Permissible Exposure Limit (PEL) (e.g., in the presence of high humidity).

Quantitative  
Equipment can determine the concentrations of a control substance (challenge agent) inside and outside the mask or to determine the flow rate of air flowing under the mask. Quantitative methods are more accurate and reliable than qualitative methods because they do not rely on subjective sensing of the challenge agent. Perhaps the most important consideration is the fact that unlike qualitative methods, the quantitative methods provide a data-based, defensible metric.

Aerosol methods 
An aerosol test is carried out by measuring the internal and external aerosol concentrations. The aerosol can be artificially created (to check the mask), or a natural atmospheric component. The ratio of external concentration to the concentration under the mask is called a fit factor (FF). U.S. law requires employers to offer employees a mask with large enough fit factor. For half face-piece masks (used when the concentration of harmful substances is not more than 10 PEL), the fit factor should not be less than 100; and for full face masks (not more than 50 PEL), the fit factor should not be less than 500. The safety factor of 10 compensates for the difference between testing and workplace conditions. To use an atmospheric aerosol one needs a PortaCount or AccuFIT device. These devices increase the size of the smallest particles through a process of vapor condensation (Condensation Particle Counting or CPC), and then determines their concentration (by count). Aerosols may be: sodium chloride, calcium carbonate,  and others. This method has been used as gold standard for determining whether or not a given respirator fits a healthcare worker in healthcare settings and research laboratories.

Recently OSHA approved a Fast Fit Protocol which enables the AAC/CPC (Ambient Aerosol Concentration/Condensation Particle Counting) method to be performed in less than three minutes. The major advantage of the AAC/CPC method is that the test subject is moving and breathing while the fit factor is being measured. This dynamic measurement is more representative of the actual conditions under which the respirator is used in the workplace.

Flow (pressure) methods 
These methods appeared later than aerosol. When a worker inhales, a portion of the aerosol is deposited in their respiratory organs, and the concentration measured during the exhalation becomes lower than during inhalation. During inhalation leaked unfiltered air trickles under the mask, not actually mixing with air under the mask. If such a stream collides with the sampling probe, the measured concentration becomes higher than the actual value. But if the trickle does not come into contact with a probe the concentration becomes lower.

Control Negative Pressure (CNP) from OHD, LLLP directly measures facepiece leakage. Using state of the art Controlled Negative Pressure, the Quantifit pulls a negative pressure inside your mask, and to keep the pressure constant, it must pull out any additional air that leaks into the respirator. This measurement tells you how much air has leaked into the respirator, and this is converted into a fit factor. Using a challenge pressure of 53.8 – 93.1 L/min, the OHD Quantifit stresses the mask as an employee would while breathing heavily under extreme physical conditions. The manufacturer of the CNP device claims that the use of air as a standard (non-varying) gaseous challenge agent provides a more rigorous test of mask fit than an aerosol agent. If air leaks into a respirator, there is a chance that the particles, vapors, or gas contaminants also may leak in.

Using the Redon Protocol, a complete mask fit test can be performed in under 3 minutes.
The CNP Method of fit testing is OSHA, NFPA and ISO certified (among others).

Dichot method differs from CNP in that common filters are installed on the mask and the air is pumped out from the mask at high speed. In this case, a vacuum exists under the mask. The degree of negative pressure depends on the resistance of the filters and on the amount of leaking air. The resistance of the filter is measured with a sealed attachment of the mask to a dummy. This allows the operator to determine the amount of air leaking through the gaps.

Comparison 
The main advantage of qualitative fit test methods is the low cost of equipment, while their main drawback is their modest precision, and that they cannot be used to test tight-fitting respirators that are intended for use in atmospheres that exceed 10 PEL (due to the low sensitivity). To reduce the risk of choosing a respirator with poor fit, the mask needs to have a sufficiently high fitting characteristic. Multiple masks must be examined to find the "most reliable", although poor test protocols may give incorrect results. Re-checks require time and increase costs. In 2001, the most commonly used QLFT was irritant smoke and saccharin, but in 2004, NIOSH advised against using irritant smoke.

CNP is a relatively inexpensive and fast method among quantitative methods. However, it is not possible to fit test the disposable filtering  face-piece mask (such as the N95, N99, and N100 masks) with CNP. Artificial aerosol fell out of favor due to the need to use an aerosol chamber or a special shelter that supports a given aerosol concentration which makes the test too difficult and costly. Fit tests with an atmospheric aerosol may be used on any respirator, but the cost of earlier devices (PortaCount) and the duration of the test was slightly greater than CNP. However the newer OSHA Fast Fit Protocols for CNC methods, and introduction of newer instruments, have made all quantitative fit test devices equivalent in price and time required for testing. The CNP method has at present about 15% of the fit test market in industry. One such instrument is the Quantifit. The Current CNC instruments are the PortaCount 8040 and the AccuFIT 9000.

Industry 
U.S. law began to require employers to assign and test a mask for each employee prior to assignment to a position requiring the use of a respirator and thereafter every 12 months, and optionally, in case of circumstances that could affect fit (injury, tooth loss, etc.). Other developed countries have similar requirements. A U.S. study showed that this requirement was fulfilled by almost all large enterprises. In small enterprises, with fewer than 10 workers, it was broken by about half of employers in 2001. The main reason for such violations may be the cost of specialized equipment for quantitative fit tests, insufficient accuracy of qualitative fit tests and the fact that small organizations have fewer rigorous compliance processes.

+ - may be used; - - cannot be used; (*) - NIOSH recommended to stop using this method.

References

External links
 Respirator fit testing in YouTube
Jeff Weed Be Prepared with a Complete Respiratory Protection Plan July 2009. Managing Infection Control, 6pp

Safety equipment
Respirators

fr:Masque à gaz#Étanchéité